The Roman Catholic Archdiocese of Córdoba (erected 10 May 1570, as the Diocese of Córdoba) is in Argentina and is a metropolitan diocese and its suffragan sees include Cruz del Eje, San Francisco, Villa de la Concepción del Río Cuarto and Villa María as well as the Territorial Prelature of Deán Funes. It was elevated on 20 April 1934.

Bishops

Ordinaries
Francisco Beaumonte, O.F.M. (10 May 1570 Appointed – ); did not take effect
Jerónimo Albornoz, O.F.M. (1570–1574)
Jerónimo de Villa Carrillo, O.F.M. (27 Mar 1577 Appointed – )
Francisco de Vitoria, O.P. (1578–1592)
Fernando Trexo y Senabria, O.F.M. (1594–1614)
Julián de Cortázar (1617–1625), appointed Archbishop of Santafé en Nueva Granada
Tomás de la Torre Gibaja, (Tomás de Torres) O.P. (1628–1630)
Melchor Maldonado y Saavedra, O.S.A. (1631–1662)
Francisco de Borja (1668–1679), appointed Bishop of Trujillo
Nicolás de Ulloa y Hurtado de Mendoza, O.S.A. (1679–1686)
Juan Bravo Dávila y Cartagena (1687–1691)
Juan Manuel Mercadillo, O.P. (1694–1704)
Manuel González Virtus (1708–1710)
Alonso del Pozo y Silva (1713–1723), appointed Bishop of Santiago de Chile
José Manuel de Sarricolea y Olea (1723–1730), appointed Bishop of Santiago de Chile
José Antonio Gutiérrez y Ceballos (1730–1740), appointed Archbishop of Lima
Pedro Miguel Argandoña Pastene Salazar (1745–1762), appointed Archbishop of La Plata o Charcas
Manuel de Abad e Illanar, O. Praem. (1762–1771), appointed Bishop of Arequipa
Juan Manuel Moscoso y Peralta (1771–1778), appointed Bishop of Cuzco
José Campos Julián, O.C.D. (1778–1789), appointed Archbishop of La Plata o Charcas
Angel Mariano Moscoso Pérez y Oblitas (1787–1804)
Rodrigo Antonio de Orellana, O. Praem. (1805–1818), appointed Bishop of Ávila
Benito Lascano y Castillo (1836–1836)
José Gregorio Baigorria (1857–1858)
José Vicente Ramírez de Arellano (1858–1873)
Eduardo Manuel Alvarez (1876–1878)
Mamerto Esquiú Medina, O.F.M. (1880–1883)
Juan José Blas Tissera, O.F.M. (1884–1886)
Reinaldo Toro, O.P. (1888–1904)
Zenón Bustos y Ferreyra, O.F.M. (1904–1925)
Fermín Emilio Lafitte (1927–1958), appointed Coadjutor Archbishop of Buenos Aires
Ramón José Castellano (1958–1965)
Raúl Francisco Primatesta (1965–1998); elevated to Cardinal in 1973
Carlos José Ñáñez (1998–2021)
Ángel Sixto Rossi, S.J. (2021–present)

Auxiliary bishops
Benito Lascano y Castillo (1830–1836), appointed Bishop here
José Hurtado de Mendoza (1842–1851); never consecrated?
Uladislao Javier Castellano (1892–1895), appointed Archbishop of Buenos Aires
Rosendo de la Lastra y Gordillo (1892–1898), appointed Bishop of Paraná
Aquilino Ferreyra y Álvarez (1899–1910)
Filemón Cabanillas (1899–1913)
Inocencio Dávila y Matos (1914–1927), appointed Bishop of Catamarca
José Anselmo Luque (1914–1930)
Leopoldo Buteler (1932–1934), appointed Bishop of Río Cuarto
Ramón José Castellano (1945–1958), appointed Archbishop here
Horacio Arturo Gómez Dávila (1958–1960), appointed Coadjutor Bishop of La Rioja
Enrique Ángel Angelelli Carletti (1960–1968), appointed Bishop of La Rioja; beatified in 2019
Cándido Genaro Rubiolo (1974–1977), appointed Bishop of Villa María
Alfredo Guillermo Disandro (1975–1980), appointed Bishop of Villa María
Estanislao Esteban Karlic (1977–1983), appointed Coadjutor Archbishop of Paraná; future Cardinal
Jesús Arturo Roldán (1980–1991), appointed Bishop of San Rafael
Elmer Osmar Ramón Miani (1983–1989), appointed Bishop of Catamarca
José María Arancibia (1987–1993), appointed Coadjutor Archbishop of Mendoza
Carlos José Ñáñez (1990–1995), appointed Coadjutor Archbishop of Tucumán (later returned here as Archbishop)
Roberto Rodríguez (1992–1998), appointed Bishop of Villa María
José Ángel Rovai (1999–2006), appointed Bishop of Villa María
Pedro Javier Torres Aliaga (2013–
Ricardo Orlando Seirutti García (2015–

Other priests of this diocese who became bishops
Nicolás Videla del Pino, appointed Bishop of Paraguay (o Ssma Assunzione) in 1802
Juan Martín Janiz (Yáñez) y Paz, appointed Bishop of Santiago del Estero in 1910
Filemón Francisco Castellano, appointed Bishop of Lomas de Zamora in 1957
Marcelo Raúl Martorell, appointed Bishop of Puerto Iguazú in 2006
Marcelo Alejandro Cuenca Revuelta, appointed Bishop of Alto Valle del Río Negro in 2010
Samuel Jofré Giraudo, appointed Bishop of Villa Maria in 2013
Roberto Pío Álvarez, appointed Auxiliary Bishop of Comodoro Rivadavia in 2017

Territorial losses

External links and references

Specific

Cordoba
Cordoba
Cordoba
Cordoba